"Universal Nation" is a song by Belgian DJ/producer Mike "M.I.K.E." Dierickx under his alias Push. What began as small trance studio project in late 1997, became an international commercial success over the years. The song was first released in 1998 on the legendary Belgian trance label Bonzai Records. After receiving positive reviews, the song was signed in France, Spain and Germany. One year later, other European countries followed (UK, Italy, Norway, Sweden, The Netherlands). Due to the several individual releases, the song has three different titles: Universal Nation, Universal Nation ’99 and Universal Nation (The Real Anthem).

Mike Dierickx is generally praised for his high quality productions. Universal Nation is often quoted as an "all time favorite trance record". In 1999 Universal Nation won "Best club single Move-X Dance Awards".

Universal Nation was followed by "Cosmonautica",  "Legacy", "Please Save Me" (feat. Sunscreem) and "Strange World". All of them were extremely well received in the European clubscene. 
Today Universal Nation is regarded as an ultimate trance classic. The phrase "proceed with visual attack formation" is sampled from the 1984 film The Last Starfighter.

Tracking list
 Original Radio Mix (3:46)
 DJ JamX & DeLeon's "DuMonde" Radio Mix (3:04)
 Original Extended Mix I (10:15)
 DJ JamX & DeLeon's "DuMonde" Remix (9:00)
 Original Extended Mix II (7:57)

Charts

Original version

Universal Nation '99

Trivia
 To celebrate the 10th anniversary the special mini album “Universal Voice E.P.” will be released. A 15 minutes preview is yet available on the official Myspace page. 
 In 2007 Dutch jump-style duo Jeckyll & Hyde made a radio remix of “Universal Nation”.
 DJ Tiesto used the Club Illusion live recording of this song in his 1999 release Live at Innercity: Amsterdam RAI. The recording was then incorrectly labeled as "The Anthem".

References

External links
http://houbi.com/belpop/telexn/19990604.htm

1998 singles
Trance songs
Electronic songs
1998 songs